Scutellaria cardiophylla, known as gulf skullcap and heartleaf skullcap, is a species of flowering plant in the mint family. It is native to Texas, Louisiana, Arkansas, and Oklahoma; it is considered a rare/imperiled species across most of its range.

References

Flora of the Southeastern United States
cardiophylla
Flora without expected TNC conservation status